Betula costata is a species of tree belonging to the family Betulaceae.

Its native range is Russian Far East to Korea.

References

costata